Akineyevo (Äkänäy) is a rural locality (a village) in Kaleginsky Selsoviet, Kaltasinsky District, Bashkortostan, Russia. The population was 68 as of 2010. There is 1 street.

Geography 
Akineyevo is located 30 km northwest of Kaltasy (the district's administrative centre) by road. Chilibeyevo is the nearest rural locality.

References 

Rural localities in Kaltasinsky District